The Office of the Vice President (OVP) is an administrative, advisory, consultative government agency which aids the Vice President of the Philippines in performing their duty as the second-highest executive official of the government of the Philippines.

Office
During the Commonwealth Period until its dissolution after the imposition of Martial Law in 1972, the Office of the Vice President was hosted within the Malacañang Palace complex inside the Executive Building (now Kalayaan Hall).

When the office was re-established in 1987 with Salvador Laurel as Vice President, the OVP took office at the Legislative Building (which now hosts the National Museum of Fine Arts) in the former Prime Minister's office.

The OVP moved out of the building when the National Museum organization took over the building. The Vice President's office then took office at the Philippine International Convention Center (PICC) and the PNB Financial Center, both in Pasay. During Vice President Jejomar Binay's tenure, the OVP was hosted at the Coconut Palace. During Vice President Leni Robredo's tenure and the first month of her successor Sara Duterte's term, the OVP is hosted at the Quezon City Reception House. The present office is hosted at Robinsons Cybergate Plaza in Mandaluyong.

See also 
 List of vice presidents of the Philippines
 Office of the President of the Philippines

References

Vice President, Office of the